Amaranta Fernández Navarro (born 11 August 1983) is a Spanish former volleyball player, playing as a central. 
She was part of the Spain women's national volleyball team.

She competed at the 2011 Women's European Volleyball Championship. On club level she played for Atom Trefl Sopot.

References

External links
 FIVB profile
 Zimbio gallery
 
 

1983 births
Living people
Spanish women's volleyball players
Spanish beach volleyball players
Place of birth missing (living people)
Competitors at the 2005 Mediterranean Games
Competitors at the 2018 Mediterranean Games
Mediterranean Games bronze medalists for Spain
Mediterranean Games medalists in volleyball
European Games competitors for Spain
Beach volleyball players at the 2015 European Games
Spanish expatriate sportspeople in Poland
Expatriate volleyball players in Poland